The discography of American musical duo Pomplamoose consists of six studio albums, eight compilation albums, one soundtrack, one live album, three extended plays, 29 music videos, and over 210 singles.

Albums

Studio albums

Compilation albums

Live albums

Soundtrack albums

Extended plays

Singles

2000s

2010s

2020s

Music videos

Notes 

Discographies of American artists
Pop music discographies